The middle cardiac nerve (great cardiac nerve), the largest of the three cardiac nerves, arises from the middle cervical ganglion, or from the trunk between the middle and inferior ganglia. 

On the right side it descends behind the common carotid artery, and at the root of the neck runs either in front of or behind the subclavian artery; it then descends on the trachea, receives a few filaments from the recurrent nerve, and joins the right half of the deep part of the cardiac plexus. 

In the neck, it communicates with the superior cardiac and recurrent nerves. 

On the left side, the middle cardiac nerve enters the chest between the left carotid and subclavian arteries, and joins the left half of the deep part of the cardiac plexus.

See also
 Middle cervical ganglion

References

Sympathetic nervous system